Paso del Sapo  is a village and municipality in Chubut Province in southern Argentina. Its boundaries were established in 1995. The Paso del Sapo Formation is named after the village.

References

Gallery 

Populated places in Chubut Province